HD 129445 is a G type star found in the Circinus constellation located approximately 220 light-years away from the Sun based on parallax. It is invisible to the naked eye with an apparent visual magnitude of 8.80. The star has been under the Magellan Planet Search Program observation due to its absolute visual magnitude and high metallicity. The Magellan program conducted 17 doppler velocity tests, which spans a full orbital period. The results led the program to detect a planet dubbed HD 129445 b whose readings was accurate to the Keplerian orbital model.

See also 
 HD 152079
 HD 164604
 HD 175167
 HD 86226
 List of extrasolar planets

References 

G-type main-sequence stars
Planetary systems with one confirmed planet
Circinus (constellation)
CD-68 01403
129445
072203